The Alder River is a  river in Maine. A tributary of the Androscoggin River, the Alder flows west from Locke Mills to Bethel.

See also
List of rivers of Maine

References

Maine Streamflow Data from the USGS
Maine Watershed Data From Environmental Protection Agency

Tributaries of the Kennebec River
Rivers of Oxford County, Maine
Bethel, Maine